Thomas Schønnemann (born 16 April 1970) is a retired Danish football defender.

References

1970 births
Living people
Danish men's footballers
Hvidovre IF players
Akademisk Boldklub players
F.C. Copenhagen players
Danish Superliga players
Association football defenders
People from Hvidovre Municipality
Sportspeople from the Capital Region of Denmark